Crateús is a Brazilian city in the northwest of the state of Ceará in Northeastern Brazil with an estimated 75,159 inhabitants, and one of the most important and oldest cities in the county. Popularly known as the Capital of the West, it is a city with significant regional importance, standing out in the traditional function of marketing rural products, resulting from the development of family agriculture, with emphasis on the large production of corn and beans, at the foot of the rich valleys in the region, geographically cut by the Poti River and Serra Grande. It was once one of the largest biofuel producers in the Northeast, with a production capacity of 118,800 m3 of biodiesel per year according to the company. Crateús also hosts a Brazilian Army unit.  It is located in a wealthy part of the state, close to the western border. Crateús is the seat of the Roman Catholic Diocese of Crateús.  It was established by Portuguese explorers in the 17th century in uplands originally inhabited by indigenous peoples.

The municipality contains part of the  Serra das Almas Private Natural Heritage Reserve, which preserves an area of the Caatinga biome.

The city is served by Dr. Lúcio Lima Airport.

See also
 Ceará#Largest cities
 List of municipalities in Ceará

References

Municipalities in Ceará